The 2017 New York Cosmos season was the new Cosmos' fifth season of existence, playing in the new North American Soccer League. Including the previous franchise, this was the 19th season of a club entitled New York Cosmos playing professional soccer in the New York metropolitan area.

Background 

The 2016 season saw the Cosmos achieve a league-best 20–5–7 combined regular season record. In the Soccer Bowl playoffs, the Cosmos defeated Rayo OKC in the semifinals before beating Indy Eleven in penalty kicks in Soccer Bowl 2016 on November 13, 2016. It was the franchise's sixth division two honor. Including the previous franchise, it was the Cosmos' eighth Soccer Bowl title.

Following that successful 2016 Championship run, the Cosmos and the league faced serious questions on survival. In the week after the championship game, league officials and team owners met in Atlanta for a crisis meeting on November 29. Two franchises (Ottawa Fury FC and Tampa Bay Rowdies) had already made plans to leave for the USL. The Cosmos had already started laying off front office staff and entered furlough on other staff and club members.

On December 14, Cosmos chairman Seamus O'Brien publicly announced that the Cosmos will not field a team in 2017. The USSF still had not made a decision on the divisional status of the NASL or USL. The announcement and talks had been delayed several times, and O'Brien felt that the Cosmos could not play in a Division 3 sanctioned league. By this time the Cosmos had released all of their players and coaching staff from their contracts and left a skeleton crew to operate the front office.

The following players signed with other teams prior to the announcement of the Cosmos returning for 2017. (Danny Szetela had signed with the NASL expansion San Francisco Deltas but returned to the Cosmos.)

On January 6, 2017; the USSF announced that they had granted the NASL and USL provisional Division 2 status for the 2017 seasons. Both leagues received waivers to structuring laws and regulations that must be met to keep their Division 2 status in the following years. Four days later on January 10, the Cosmos publicly announced that Rocco Commisso (CEO of Mediacom) had taken over as majority owner of the team. The Italian had emigrated to the United States when he was a child and played for Columbia University's soccer program before trying out for the US Men's National Olympic Team in 1972. Columbia University's soccer stadium is named after him, leading many to believe that the Cosmos may play there or at MCU Park in 2017.

On February 2; the club made the "re-rebirth" official by announcing that many players have already returned and that they will be playing 16 regular season games at MCU Park in Brooklyn. Season tickets went on sale first to former season ticket holders on February 3.

On March 17, 2017, the team announced a new broadcasting deal with MSG and WPIX-TV. Their previous broadcaster, One World Sports, had been shut down.

Club

Kit
Supplier: Inaria / Sponsor: Emirates (airline)
Last Update: November 12 game @ San Francisco Deltas

Roster

Competitions

Exhibition

Match reports

Exhibition Statistics
3 Goals

 Irvin Herrera

2 Goals

 Emmanuel Ledesma

1 Goal

 Juan Francisco Guerra
 Eugene Starikov
 Javi Márquez
 Andrea Mancini
 Andrés Flores
 Eric Calvillo

NASL Spring Season 

The NASL regular season will now feature two equal seasons

Standings

Results

Results by round

Match reports

NASL Fall Season 

The NASL regular season will now feature two equal seasons

Standings

Results

Results by round

Match reports

The Championship

U.S. Open Cup

Match reports

Squad statistics

Appearances and goals

|-
|colspan="14"|Players who appeared for the New York Cosmos who are no longer at the club:

|}

Goal scorers

Own goal scorers

Disciplinary record

National Team Call-Ups

Transfers

In

Out

Loan in

Loan out

References 

New York Cosmos (2010–) seasons
New York Cosmos
New York Cosmos
Cosmos